Philip Hoffman or other variants may refer to:

Actors
Philip Seymour Hoffman (1967–2014), Academy Award-winning American actor 
Philip Hoffman (Broadway actor) (born 1954), Broadway actor in Into the Woods

Politicians
Philip Hoffman (British politician) (1878–1959), British trade unionist and Labour Party politician
Phillip Hoffman (Ontario politician), represented Timiskaming in Ontario legislature

Others
Philip Hoffmann (alpine skier) (born 2002), Austrian olympic alpine skier
Philip Hoffman (filmmaker) (born 1955), Canadian filmmaker
Philip Hoffman, co-founder of Thrift Drug
Philip Hoffman (surfing) (1930–2010), American surfer and garment executive
 Phil Hoffman, producer of rock music documentaries, including It's Everything, And Then It's Gone
Phil Hoffman (Neighbours), fictional character on the Australian soap opera Neighbours
Philipp Hoffmann (architect) (1806–1889), German architect and builder
Philipp Hoffmann (footballer) (born 1992), German footballer 
Philip Guthrie Hoffman (1915–2008), President and first Chancellor of the University of Houston
Philip B. Hofmann (1909–1986), American businessman
Philipp Hofmann (photographer), German photographer
Philipp Hofmann (born 1993), German footballer
Philip E. Hoffman, lawyer and president of the American Jewish Committee

See also
 Phil Hoffman House, in Oskaloosa, Iowa
Hoffman Philip (1872–1951), American diplomat
 Hoffman